Petar Đenić (Serbian Cyrillic: Петар Ђeнић; born 14 April 1977) is a Serbian former footballer who played as a centre back.

A native of Niš, Serbia's third-largest city, Đenić started his career with the hometown teams, FK Sinđelić Niš and, later, FK Radnički Niš. He subsequently played for Crvena Zvezda, Ahlen, Olympiakos Nicosia, Alki Larnaca and Lienden. Before the transfer to Red Star Belgrade, he was on trial at German club Bayern Munich.

He played one match for the FR Yugoslavia national team in a friendly match against Greece held on 13 December 2000.

References

External links
 

Living people
1977 births
Sportspeople from Niš
Serbian footballers
Serbia and Montenegro international footballers
Serbian expatriate footballers
FK Radnički Niš players
Red Star Belgrade footballers
Rot Weiss Ahlen players
Expatriate footballers in Germany
Olympiakos Nicosia players
Alki Larnaca FC players
Expatriate footballers in Cyprus
Association football midfielders
2. Bundesliga players
Cypriot First Division players
Serbia and Montenegro expatriate footballers
Serbia and Montenegro footballers
Serbia and Montenegro expatriate sportspeople in Germany
Serbian expatriate sportspeople in Cyprus
Serbian expatriate sportspeople in the Netherlands
FC Lienden players